Cerro Champaquí is a mountain located west of the Argentine province of Córdoba. It is the highest peak in the province, with a height of 2,770 meters. It is considered to be the second natural wonder of Cordoba from the "Seven Natural Wonders of Cordoba".

Cerro Champaquí is located in the western-most point of the Sierras de Cordoba, which is known as the Sierras Grandes. East of the mountain lies the Valle de Calamuchita. On the latter, Valle de Traslasierra lies west of the mountain. Cerro Champaquí and its surroundings belong to the Monumento Natural Champaquí.

Topography 
Cerro Champaquí has moderately steep slopes to the west, with more gentle slopes on its eastern foothills. In the vicinity of the summit there is a small lake that freezes from late April to early August. This lake is believed to be the source of the mountain's name. In the indigenous language Comechingón, Champaqui means "Water-in-the-head / Water at the top of the hill".

On Cerro Champaqui's eastern slope is the town of Santa Rosa de Calamuchita. On the western side is the town of Villa de Las Rosas.

The common path to ascend the mountain begins at Villa Alpina on the east slopes of the mountain.

See also 
 Pampa de Achala
 Mountain

External links 

 http://esfa.iua.edu.ar/wordpress/actividades/expedicion-al-cerro-champaqui-23-10-2010.html (Fuerza Aérea Argentina - Argentine Air Force)
 https://web.archive.org/web/20130906055830/http://www.villayacanto.gov.ar/contenidos/champaqui.html Villa Yacanto Official Website

References

Mountains of Argentina
Landforms of Córdoba Province, Argentina
Sierras Pampeanas